Machian (also Romanized as Māchīān and Macheyān) is a village in Machian Rural District, Kelachay District, Rudsar County, Gilan Province, Iran.
At the 2006 census, its population was 603, in 190 families.
Machian is located East of Gilan province and north of city of Roodsar. The district has 43 villages. The village has 190 households and 603 inhabitants. 458 residents of the village are literate. The dominant religion is Shiite Muslim. Majority of inhabitants speak Gilaki dialect. "Pilarood" river (Big river) is located near Machian and multiple branches passes through the village. Rice and citrus are the staple crops in the region.

References 

Populated places in Rudsar County